Global Mall Taoyuan A8 is a shopping mall located in Guishan District, Taoyuan City, Taiwan that opened in November 2015.

Facilities
The main operating floors are B1 to level 2, the latter floor is the main channel connecting to the metro station and Chang Gung Memorial Hospital. It offers exclusive characteristic themed restaurants, small exotic restaurants, and provide a complete rest space; on the first floor, a compound store-type store combines light meals and catering.

See also
 List of tourist attractions in Taiwan
 Global Mall Taoyuan A19
 Global Mall Pingtung

References

External links

2015 establishments in Taiwan
Shopping malls in Taoyuan
Shopping malls established in 2015